Mainscream is the second studio album by Serbian hard rock band Cactus Jack, released in 2005.

With Mainscream Cactus Jack made a slight shift from their traditional hard rock style towards more melodic hard rock sound. The lyrics for the song "Glumica" ("Actress") were written by singer Bebi Dol. The album cover was designed by the band's old associate Dragoljub "Paja" Bogdanović, who would in 2015 become the band's frontman.

Track listing
All songs written by Stevan Birak and Vladimir Jezidimirović except where noted.

Personnel
Vladimir Jezdimirović - vocals
Stevan Birak - guitar
Miodrag Krudulj - bass guitar
Dušan Gnjidić - drums
Zoran Samuilov - keyboard

Additional personnel
Saša Habić - producer, arrangements, mixing, mastering
Zoran Vukčević - recorded by, mixing
Radovan Maričić - recorded by
Dragoljub "Paja" Bogdanović - cover design
Zoltan Totka - photography

References 

Mainscream at Discogs

External link
Mainscream at Discogs

Cactus Jack (band) albums
2005 albums
Serbian-language albums
PGP-RTS albums